This is a list of what are intended to be the notable top hotels by country, five or four star hotels, notable skyscraper landmarks or historic hotels which are covered in multiple reliable publications. It should not be a directory of every hotel in every country:

Cambodia

 Grand Hotel d'Angkor, Siem Reap
 Hotel Cambodiana, Phnom Penh
 Hotel Le Royal, Phnom Penh
 Independence Hotel, Sihanoukville
 InterContinental Phnom Penh, Phnom Penh
 Phnom Penh Hotel, Phnom Penh

Canada

Chad
Kempinski Hotel N'Djamena, N'Djamena

Chile
Agustín Ross Hotel, Pichilemu
 ESO Hotel, Paranal Observatory
San Alfonso del Mar Resort, Algarrobo

China

 Astor House Hotel, Shanghai
 Beijing Hotel, Beijing
 Broadway Mansions, Shanghai
 Centre Hotel (Nanjing), Nanjing
 China Hotel, Guangzhou
 Diaoyutai State Guesthouse, Beijing
 East Asia Hotel, Shanghai
 Fairmont Beijing, Beijing
 The Garden Hotel, Guangzhou, Guangzhou
 Grand Hyatt Beijing, Beijing
 Grand Hyatt Shanghai, Shanghai
 Hotel Landmark Canton, Guangzhou
 Jin Jiang Tower, Shanghai
 Jin Mao Tower, Shanghai
 Jinjiang Hotel, Shanghai
 Jinling Hotel, Nanjing
 JW Marriott Shanghai, Shanghai
 Lhasa Hotel, Lhasa
 Lusongyuan Hotel, Beijing
 Minzu Hotel, Beijing
 Morgan Plaza, Beijing
 Park Hotel Shanghai, Shanghai
 Peace Hotel, Shanghai
 The PuLi Hotel and Spa, Shanghai
 Shimao Wonderland Intercontinental, Songjiang
 St. Regis Shanghai Hotel, Shanghai
 URBN hotels Shanghai, Shanghai
 White Swan Hotel, Guangzhou

Costa Rica
 Gran Hotel, San José

Croatia
Regent Esplanade, Zagreb

Cuba

 El Senador, Cayo Coco
 Hotel Ambos Mundos, Havana
 Hotel Capri, Havana
 Hotel Habana Riviera, Havana
 Hotel Inglaterra, Havana
 Hotel Nacional de Cuba, Havana
 Hotel Tryp Habana Libre, Havana
 Meliá Cohiba Hotel, Havana
 Sevilla Hotel, Havana

Curaçao

Dreams Curaçao Resort
Plaza Hotel Curaçao

Czech Republic

 Berštejn Castle, Dubá
 Four Seasons Hotel, Prague
 Grandhotel Pupp, Karlovy Vary
 Hilton Prague, Prague
 Hotel Crowne Plaza Prague, Prague
 Hotel InterContinental Prague, Prague
 Hotel International, Brno
 Hotel Paris, Prague

C